Looney Tunes: Back in Action is a 2003 American live-action/animated comedy film produced by Warner Bros. Feature Animation and distributed by Warner Bros. Pictures. It is the second theatrical feature film in the Looney Tunes franchise, and was directed by Joe Dante from a screenplay by Larry Doyle. The film stars Brendan Fraser, Jenna Elfman, and Steve Martin; Timothy Dalton, Heather Locklear, and Bill Goldberg appear in supporting roles, while Joe Alaskey leads the voice cast. The film, which parodies action and spy film conventions, follows Bugs Bunny and Daffy Duck as they become intertwined in a plot by the ACME Chairman (Martin) to transform the world's population into subservient monkeys using the Blue Monkey diamond. They accompany aspiring stuntman DJ Drake (Fraser) and Warner Bros. executive Kate Houghton (Elfman) on their journey to thwart the Chairman's plot, which doubles as a mission to rescue the former's abducted father, Damian (Dalton).

The film was the result of multiple attempts by Warner Bros. to develop a sequel to Space Jam (1996). It was originally developed as a direct sequel titled Spy Jam, which was intended to include Jackie Chan in the lead role. Dante, out of a personal dislike for Space Jam, substantially developed the project to more closely represent the personalities of the Looney Tunes characters, with Eric Goldberg serving as the animation director. However, Dante reportedly had no creative control for the project, and the final film became different from what he intended. The film was the last project for composer Jerry Goldsmith, who died eight months following its release; John Debney composed additional material for the score.

Looney Tunes: Back in Action was theatrically released in the United States on November 14, 2003, by Warner Bros. Pictures. The film received mixed to positive reviews from critics, who praised the animation and humor while criticizing the screenplay, with many critics considering it an improvement over Space Jam. It was a box-office bomb, grossing $68.5 million worldwide on an $80 million budget. Warner Bros., developing a franchise revival around the film, subsequently canceled several planned related projects, including new theatrical short films. It was the final film to be produced by Warner Bros. Feature Animation and the last theatrical Looney Tunes feature film until Space Jam: A New Legacy (2021).

Plot

Weary of playing villainous roles in Bugs Bunny's cartoons, Daffy Duck demands his own animated film, but is dismissed by Vice President of Comedy Kate Houghton. Security guard and aspiring stuntman DJ Drake is ordered to escort Daffy from the studio; in the ensuing chase, a Batmobile demolishes the water tower, leading to DJ's dismissal. Daffy follows DJ home, where the former receives a message from his father, actor Damian Drake, who DJ learns is a secret agent. Damian tells DJ to travel to Las Vegas, contact his associate Dusty Tails, and find the blue monkey diamond. Damian is then captured by the Acme Corporation, led by the eccentric Mr. Chairman. DJ and Daffy depart for Las Vegas.

Bugs' routines fail without Daffy. Kate is told to rehire Daffy, or face termination herself. Kate and Bugs arrive at DJ's house, where they find Damian's TVR Tuscan and use it in pursuit of DJ and Daffy. In Las Vegas, DJ and Daffy meet Dusty in a casino owned by Yosemite Sam, who is employed by Acme. Dusty gives them a unique playing card, a clue to finding the diamond. Sam and his henchmen pursue DJ and Daffy for the card, but they flee with Bugs and Kate. The Tuscan crashes in a desert, where Wile E. Coyote tries in vain to steal the card from the group.

The group eventually discovers Area 52, run by a woman known as Mother. Mother shows the group a short film about the blue monkey, which can devolve humans into monkeys. Marvin the Martian, imprisoned in the facility, leads a group of aliens to try to steal the card, but DJ's group escapes. Seeing Mona Lisa's face on the card, the group conclude they must view the painting in the Louvre.

At the Louvre, the group discover that the card contains a viewing window for the Mona Lisa and use it to discover a hidden map of Africa. Elmer Fudd appears and chases Bugs and Daffy through several paintings to obtain the card. Meanwhile, Kate is kidnapped by Beaky Buzzard and Smith, Mr. Chairman's bodyguard. DJ rescues Kate, while Elmer disintegrates into tiny dots after emerging from a pointillist painting.

The group travels to Africa and meet Granny, Sylvester, and Tweety, who escort them to the ruins of a jungle temple containing the blue monkey. At that point, Granny and company reveal themselves to be Mr. Chairman, Smith, and Taz in disguise. Mr. Chairman teleports everyone to the Acme headquarters and tricks DJ into giving him the diamond in exchange for Damian's release.

Marvin is sent to place the diamond in an Acme satellite's ray gun; with it, Mr. Chairman plans to turn most of the world's population into monkeys to make his products before reverting the population into people who will buy them. DJ and Kate rescue Damian from a death trap, while Bugs and Daffy chase Marvin into space. Marvin defeats Bugs, prompting Daffy to become Duck Dodgers in order to destroy the diamond. The intervention leads to Mr. Chairman transforming into a monkey, leading to his arrest. Bugs and Daffy return to Earth, where it is revealed that the preceding events were staged. Bugs promises Daffy that they will be equal partners, before the latter is flattened by the Looney Tunes rings. Porky Pig attempts to close the film with "That's all, folks!", but the studio closes, to Porky's indignation.

Cast
 Brendan Fraser as Damian "D. J." Drake, Jr. / himself
 Fraser also voiced Tasmanian Devil and Tasmanian She-Devil
 Jenna Elfman as Kate Houghton
 Steve Martin as Mr. Chairman
 Heather Locklear as Dusty Tails
 Joan Cusack as Mother
 Timothy Dalton as Damian Drake
 Bill Goldberg as Bob Smith
 Don Stanton as Mr. Warner
 Dan Stanton as Mr. Warner's brother
 Dick Miller as Security Guard (cameo)
 Roger Corman as Hollywood Director (cameo)
 Paula Abdul as herself (cameo)
 Jeff Gordon as himself (cameo)
 Kevin McCarthy as Dr. Miles Bennell (cameo)
 Michael Jordan as himself (cameo via archive footage from Space Jam)
 Marc Lawrence as Acme VP, Stating the Obvious
 Ron Perlman as Acme VP, Never Learning
 Robert Picardo as Acme VP, Rhetorical Questions

Voices
 Joe Alaskey as Daffy Duck, Bugs Bunny, Sylvester, Beaky Buzzard, and Mama Bear
 Jeff Bennett as Foghorn Leghorn, Yosemite Sam, and Nasty Canasta
 Billy West as Elmer Fudd and Peter Lorre
 Eric Goldberg as Marvin the Martian, Speedy Gonzales, and Tweety
 Bruce Lanoil as Pepé Le Pew
 June Foray as Granny
 Bob Bergen as Porky Pig
 Casey Kasem as Shaggy Rogers
 Frank Welker as Scooby-Doo
 Danny Chambers as Cottontail Smith
 Stan Freberg as Junior Bear
 Will Ryan as Papa Bear
 Danny Mann as Robo Dog and Spy Car
 Mel Blanc as Gremlin Car (archive recordings)
 Paul Julian as Road Runner (archive recordings) (uncredited)
 Bill Roberts as Michigan J. Frog (archive recordings) (uncredited)
 Jackie Morrow as Owl Jolson (archive recordings) (uncredited)

Production
Looney Tunes: Back in Action was initially developed as a sequel to Space Jam (1996). As development began, the film's plot was going to involve a new basketball competition with Michael Jordan and the Looney Tunes against a new alien villain named Berserk-O!. Artist Bob Camp was tasked with designing Berserk-O! and his henchmen. Joe Pytka would have returned to direct and Spike Brandt and Tony Cervone signed on as the animation supervisors. However, Jordan did not agree to star in a sequel. According to Camp, a producer lied to the studio, claiming that Jordan had signed on in order to keep development going. Without Jordan involved with the project, Warner Bros. was uninterested, and cancelled plans for Space Jam 2.

The film then re-entered development as Spy Jam and was to star Jackie Chan. Warner Bros. was also planning a film titled Race Jam, which would have starred racing driver Jeff Gordon. Both projects were ultimately cancelled. Warner Bros. eventually asked Joe Dante to direct Back in Action. In the early 1990s, Dante wanted to produce a biographical comedy with HBO, called Termite Terrace. It centered around director filmmaker and cartoonist Chuck Jones' early years at Warner Bros. in the 1930s. On the project, Dante recalled, "It was a hilarious story and it was very good except that Warner Bros. said, 'Look, it's an old story. It's got period stuff in it. We don't want that. We want to rebrand our characters and we want to do Space Jam.'"

Dante agreed to direct Back in Action as tribute to Jones. He and screenwriter Larry Doyle reportedly wanted the film to be the "anti-Space Jam" as Dante disliked how that film represented the Looney Tunes brand and personalities. Dante said, "I was making a movie for them with those characters [Looney Tunes: Back in Action] and they did not want to know about those characters. They didn't want to know why Bugs Bunny shouldn't do hip-hop. It was a pretty grim experience all around." Warner Bros. hired Walt Disney Feature Animation's Eric Goldberg, most known for his fast-paced, Warner Bros.-inspired animation of the Genie in Aladdin (1992), to direct the animation.

On the film, Dante stated, "It's a gagfest. Not having a particularly strong story, it just goes from gag to gag and location to location. It's not a particularly compelling narrative, but, of course, that's not where the charm of the movie is supposed to lie." On the subject of filming, Dante stated that each scene with animated characters would be shot three times; first a rehearsal with a fake stuffed stand-in, then with nothing in the frame, and lastly, with a "mirror ball" in the shot to indicate to the computers where the light sources were. Afterwards, the animators would start their work and put the characters in the frame. According to Dante, a "problem" occurred when the studio executives grew tired of the film's jokes and wanted them to be changed. As a result, the studio brought in twenty-five gag writers to try to write jokes that were short enough to fit into an animated character's mouth. Despite this, the film has one credited writer.

Dante stated that he had no creative freedom on the project, and called it "the longest year and a half of my life." Dante felt that he and Goldberg managed to preserve the original personalities of the characters. However, the opening, middle, and end of the film are different from what Dante envisioned.

Music
This was the final film scored by composer Jerry Goldsmith. Due to Goldsmith's failing health, the last reel of the film was actually scored by John Debney, though Goldsmith was the only credited composer in marketing materials and the Varèse Sarabande soundtrack album only contains Goldsmith's music (although the first and last cues are adaptations of compositions heard in Warner Bros. cartoons). Debney receives an "Additional Music by" credit in the closing titles of the film and "Special Thanks" in the soundtrack album credits. Goldsmith died in July 2004, eight months after the film's release.

Reception

Box office
Looney Tunes: Back in Action was released on November 14, 2003, originally planned to open earlier that summer. The film grossed $68.5 million worldwide against a budget of $80 million.

Warner Bros. was hoping to start a revitalized franchise of Looney Tunes media and products with the success of Back in Action. New animated shorts and a Duck Dodgers TV series were commissioned to tie-in with Back in Action. However, due to the film's financial failure, the Looney Tunes franchise remained primarily on television for nearly two decades. Warner Bros. would not produce another theatrical Looney Tunes film until Space Jam: A New Legacy, which was released in 2021.

Critical response
On review aggregator Rotten Tomatoes the film holds an approval rating of 57% based on 138 reviews, with an average rating of 6/10. The website's critics consensus reads: "The plot is a nonsensical, hyperactive jumble and the gags are relatively uninspired compared to the classic Looney Tunes cartoons." At Metacritic, the film has a weighted average score a 64 out of 100, based on 32 critics, indicating "generally favorable reviews" Audiences polled by CinemaScore gave the film an average grade of "B+" on an A+ to F scale.

Chicago Sun-Times critics Roger Ebert and Richard Roeper gave the film "Two Thumbs Up"; Roeper called it a "cheerful and self-referential romp blending animation with live action in a non-stop quest for silly laughs," while Ebert called it "goofy fun."

The film was also nominated for Saturn Award for Best Animated Film, Annie Award for Best Animated Feature and Satellite Award for Best Animated or Mixed Media Feature.

Home media
Warner Home Video released Looney Tunes: Back in Action on VHS and DVD on March 2, 2004. The film was re-released on DVD in separate widescreen and full screen editions on September 7, 2010. It was also released on Blu-ray with bonus features on December 2, 2014. A double DVD and Blu-ray release, paired with Space Jam, was released on June 7, 2016.

Video game 

The film has a platform game of the same name developed by Warthog Games and published by Electronic Arts for the PlayStation 2, GameCube and Game Boy Advance. Xbox and Microsoft Windows versions were planned, but cancelled due to the financial failure of the film.

See also
 List of films set in Las Vegas

References

External links

 
 
 
 

2003 films
2003 fantasy films
2003 animated films
2003 action comedy films
2000s American animated films
2000s action comedy films
2000s adventure comedy films
2000s fantasy comedy films
2000s English-language films
American action comedy films
American adventure comedy films
American fantasy comedy films
American films with live action and animation
Animated crossover films
Jungle adventure films
Surreal comedy films
Metafictional works
Self-reflexive films
Looney Tunes films
Duck Dodgers
Works adapted into video games
Barnyard Dawg films
Beaky Buzzard films
Bugs Bunny films
Charlie Dog films
Daffy Duck films
Elmer Fudd films
Foghorn Leghorn films
Hippety Hopper films
Marvin the Martian films
Penelope Pussycat films
Pepé Le Pew films
Porky Pig films
Ralph Wolf and Sam Sheepdog films
Speedy Gonzales films
Sylvester the Cat films
Tasmanian Devil (Looney Tunes) films
Tweety films
Wile E. Coyote and the Road Runner films
Yosemite Sam films
Films about real people
Animation based on real people
Films about father–son relationships
Films about actors
Films about films
Films about animation
Flying cars in fiction
Animated films about revenge
Films about kidnapping in the United States
Films set in Burbank, California
Films set in the Las Vegas Valley
Films set in deserts
Animated films set in Paris
Films set in museums
Films set in Africa
Films set in jungles
Films set in outer space
Films set in studio lots
Films set in 2003
Films directed by Joe Dante
Films with screenplays by Larry Doyle
Films scored by Jerry Goldsmith
Warner Bros. films
Warner Bros. animated films
Warner Bros. Animation animated films